Owd Bob is a 1998 British-Canadian drama film directed by Rodney Gibbons and starring James Cromwell, Colm Meaney and Jemima Rooper. It is based on the 1898 novel Owd Bob by Alfred Ollivant.

Differences from the book include:
 That the time has been updated by a century
 That the location is now the Isle of Man instead of Cumbria
 Adam MacAdam is the boy's grandfather, not father

Main cast
 James Cromwell - Adam MacAdam 
 Colm Meaney - Keith Moore 
 Jemima Rooper - Maggie Moore 
 John Benfield - Blake 
 Antony Booth - Tammas 
 Dermot Keaney - Peter
 Moira Brooker - Heather Moore 
 Anna Keaveney - Janet MacPherson 
 Dylan Provencher - David Roberts 
 Paul Moulton - Constable Jack 
 Len Hulme - Doctor Southam

References

External links

1998 films
English-language Canadian films
1998 drama films
1990s English-language films
British drama films
Canadian drama films
Films based on British novels
Films directed by Rodney Gibbons
1990s Canadian films
1990s British films